Keraudrenia is a genus of flowering plants native to Australia, New Guinea and Madagascar.

Species
Species include:
Keraudrenia adenogyna C.F.Wilkins 
Keraudrenia adenolasia (F.Muell.) F.M.Bailey
Keraudrenia collina Domin   
Keraudrenia corollata (Steetz) Druce 
Keraudrenia exastia C.F.Wilkins
Keraudrenia hermanniifolia J.Gay
Keraudrenia hillii F.Muell. ex Benth. 
Keraudrenia hookeriana Walp.
Keraudrenia integrifolia Steud. 
Keraudrenia katatona C.F.Wilkins 
Keraudrenia lanceolata (Steetz) Benth. 
Keraudrenia nephrosperma (F.Muell.) F.Muell.
Keraudrenia velutina Steetz

References

FloraBase - the Western Australian flora: Keraudrenia

 
Malvaceae genera